Oussoy-en-Gâtinais (literally Oussoy in Gâtinais) is a commune in the Loiret department in north-central France.

Geography
The river Solin flows northeastward through the western part of the commune.

See also
Communes of the Loiret department

References

Oussoyengatinais